Yan Vladimirovich Vorogovsky  (born 7 August 1996) is a Kazakh professional footballer who plays as a midfielder for Belgian club RWDM.

Career

Club
On 29 June 2019, Vorogovsky moved from FC Kairat to K Beerschot VA, signing a one-year contract with the Belgian club.

In June 2021, it was reported that Vorogovsky was on trial with Russian Premier League club Akhmat Grozny.

On 18 January 2022, Vorogovsky joined RWDM in Belgium on loan with an option to buy. RWDM exercised the option to make transfer permanent on 1 July 2022.

Career statistics

Club

International

International goals 
Scores and results list Kazakhstan's goal tally first.

References 

1996 births
People from Talgar
Living people
Kazakhstani footballers
Association football midfielders
Kazakhstan international footballers
FC Kaisar players
FC Kairat players
FC Sunkar players
K Beerschot VA players
RWDM47 players
Kazakhstan Premier League players
Belgian Pro League players
Challenger Pro League players
Kazakhstani expatriate footballers
Expatriate footballers in Belgium
Kazakhstani expatriate sportspeople in Belgium